Cirrhophanus is a genus of moths of the family Noctuidae. The genus was erected by Augustus Radcliffe Grote in 1872.

Species
Cirrhophanus dubifer Dyar, 1907 Mexico
Cirrhophanus dyari Cockerell, 1899 Arizona, western Texas, northern Mexico
Cirrhophanus hoffmanni Hogue, 1963
Cirrhophanus magnifer Dyar, 1907 Mexico
Cirrhophanus nigrifer Dyar, 1907 Mexico
Cirrhophanus pretiosa (Morrison, 1875) Kansas, Texas, Oklahoma, South Dakota, Arkansas
Cirrhophanus triangulifer Grote, 1872 Missouri, from (New York, New Jersey - Florida) - to (Kansas, Texas)

Former species
 Cirrhophanus papago is now Eulithosia papago (Barnes, 1907)
 Cirrhophanus plesioglauca is now Eulithosia plesioglauca (Dyar, 1912)

References

Stiriinae